Éric Pfrunder (June 1948 – December 2022) was a French artistic director for Chanel. He became their first image director in 1983 and left the company in 2021.

Pfrunder became artistic director after the death of Karl Lagerfeld, while Virginie Viard became creative director. He notably allowed Lagerfeld to become director of photography for Chanel.

Pfrunder died in December 2022, at the age of 74.

References

1948 births
2022 deaths
French art directors
Pieds-Noirs
People from Constantine, Algeria